Rebecca "Bec" Cody (born 1973) is an Australian politician. She was a Labor member of the Australian Capital Territory Legislative Assembly from 2016 to 2020, representing the electorate of Murrumbidgee. She was a hairdresser before entering politics, and owned a salon. She also worked as a unionist. Prior to her election in 2016, Cody unsuccessfully ran in the ACT electorate of Brindabella in 2012, securing only 5.6% of the first preference vote.

She lost her seat to fellow Labor candidate Marisa Paterson at the 2020 ACT election.

Controversies 
In February 2017 Bec Cody criticised an RSL club in Sussex Inlet, NSW for having pictures of Aboriginals in the men's bathroom, calling on the RSL to address "this filth as a matter of urgency". Cody spoke in camera during an adjournment of the Legislative Assembly. She faced criticism for using her position as an ACT MLA to disingenuously attack a club in a small town in New South Wales. Although Cody claimed that the pictures were in the urinals, they were in fact on the walls of the bathroom.

In 2018, Cody called for the ACT's Place Names Commission to evaluate every place name in Canberra and change the names of any which may be deemed offensive. The proposal was criticised in local and national media for wasting the time and resources of the Commission. The motion ultimately failed.

In July 2018, Cody called for the elimination of the National Capital Authority in order to promote development in the Parliamentary Triangle. In an interview with ABC Radio Canberra, Cody was unable to defend her proposal, resulting in her being labelled "an unguided missile" by opposition MLA Mark Parton.

In 2019 she was accused of wilfully misinterpreting a Greens proposal to increase vegetarian and vegan options in schools and hospitals after claiming that it "would kill me" due to her claimed allergy to fruits and vegetables.

References

1973 births
Living people
Australian Labor Party members of the Australian Capital Territory Legislative Assembly
Members of the Australian Capital Territory Legislative Assembly
21st-century Australian politicians